Gunjan Walia  is an Indian model turned television actress. She is best known for her role Krishna in the serial Kuch Apne Kuch Paraye as the main female lead. She replaced Twinkle Bajpai as Lakshmi on Ghar Ki Lakshmi Betiyann as the female lead. She has also featured in a video album "Jeena Tera Bina" by Arun Dagan. She also appeared in Naagin.

Personal life 
She married Vikas Manaktala on 21 April 2015 in Chandigarh.

Filmography

Television

Films 
 2010 Mar Jawan Gur Khake as Mehak
 2013 Ishq Garaari

References

External links

Living people
Indian television actresses
Indian soap opera actresses
1962 births
Indian film actresses
Actors from Mumbai